Mohamed Benaissa (born 3 January 1937) is a Moroccan politician who was Minister of Foreign Affairs of Morocco from 1999 to 2007.

Early life and education
Benaissa was born on 3 January 1937 in Asilah, Morocco. He received a bachelor's degree in communications from the University of Minnesota in 1963, which also awarded him an honorary doctorate in 2007.

Career
After studying at Columbia University, Benaissa went on to serve the United Nations and the UN Food and Agriculture Organization for approximately eleven years, first as press attache to the UN Moroccan Mission in New York (1965), then as information officer at the UN headquarters in New York and in Addis Ababa (1965–1967), regional information adviser for Africa at the UN Food and Agriculture Organization in Accra, Ghana (1967–1971), communications adviser for the FAO at Rome (1961–1974), director of the information division at the same (1974–1976), and finally as Assistant-Secretary General at the UN World Food Conference (1974–1975). Benaissa returned to Morocco to become Member of Parliament for the city of Asilah from 1977 to 1983, and then Mayor of Asilah in 1984, a position to which he has been reelected three times up to 2010. From 1977 to 1985 he served as chief editor to Al Mithaq (Arabic) and Al Maghrib (French) dailies, the newspapers of the Rassemblement National des Indépendants (RNI) party to which he then belonged.

Benaissa was the Minister of Culture from 1985 to 1992, and the Moroccan Ambassador to the United States from 1993 to 1999. In April 1999, King Hassan II appointed Benaissa to the position of Minister of Foreign Affairs just three months before the former's death. Benaissa remained in his position under Hassan's successor, King Mohammed VI, until he was replaced by Foreign Minister Delegate Taieb Fassi Fihri in the government formed on 15 October 2007 under Prime Minister Abbas El Fassi.

Books and recognition
Benaissa is author (with Tahar Benjelloun) of "Grains de Peau" (1974) and of essays and papers on development and communications. In 1989 Asilah was recipient of the Aga Khan Award for Architecture for the urban development project. In 2010, Benaissa won the Sheikh Zayed Book Award "Culture Personality of the Year", an award worth about $300,000.

Aboubakr Jamaï defamation suit
In April 2000, Benaissa filed a defamation lawsuit against editors Aboubakr Jamaï and Ali Amar of the Moroccan news weekly Le Journal Hebdomadaire for a 1999 series of articles alleging that Benaissa had profited from the sale of an official residence during his tenure as Ambassador to the United States. Jamaï later speculated that Benaissa "was waiting for a signal" to attack the papers and that he saw his opportunity following the announcement of a government ban. In 2001, the pair were found guilty, and sentenced to pay damages to Benaissa of 2 million dirhams (US$200,000). In addition, Jamaï was sentenced to three months' imprisonment, and Amar to two months. Reporters Without Borders sided with the editors, however, immediately calling for the Moroccan Justice Minister to overturn the verdict and asserting that "Fines should not be used by the authorities with the aim of halting the appearance or publication of a media".

See also
Yahya Bennani, diplomat who worked in Benaissa's cabinet between 2003 and 2007.

References

1937 births
People from Asilah
Living people
Columbia University alumni
University of Minnesota School of Journalism and Mass Communication alumni
Government ministers of Morocco
Ambassadors of Morocco
Ambassadors of Morocco to the United States
Foreign ministers of Morocco
Moroccan officials of the United Nations
National Rally of Independents politicians